Zafrona taylorae is a species of sea snail, a marine gastropod mollusk in the family Columbellidae, the dove snails.

Description
Original description: "Shell fusiform, elongated, with elevated spire; shoulder and spire whorls rounded; shell sculptured with numerous microscopic spiral threads, giving shell shiny, silky texture; 3 or 4 spiral threads near suture larger than others; body whorl without axial sculpture; columellar callus raised, with edge detached from shell; columella with 1 large, prominent plication; inner edge of lip bordered with 8-12 small teeth; shell translucent pale greenish-tan overlaid with dense light brown net pattern; holes in mesh of net pattern oval in shape, regularly spaced; some specimens with thin, clear band around mid-body; protoconch and early whorls dark purple-brown; columella and edge of lip white; net pattern showing through in interior of aperture."

Distribution
Locus typicus: "Rabbit Key Basin, off Rabbit Key, 
Florida Bay, Everglades National Park, Florida, USA."

References

Columbellidae
Gastropods described in 1987